Cutters Don't Cry is a young adult novel written by American author Christine Dzidrums, first published in 2010.

The novel centers on Charity Graff,  a depressed teenager, who lives her life as a secret cutter. She lives alone with her mother and cannot remember her father who left when she was an infant. After a kind therapist gives her the gift of a journal, the college student uses it to write to her father, filling him in on what's happened in her life since he left her nearly 18 years ago. Over time Charity opens up to her absentee dad about her years of self-harm and what led to it. The book takes place over several months.

Characters 
Charity Graff, the protagonist attends Long Beach City College but lacks direction and focus. She lives in a two-bedroom apartment with her mother but does not remember her father who left her when she was a baby.  She turned to cutting at the age of thirteen when her untreated depression became overwhelming and she needed a way to stifle her rush of emotions.

Hunter - Charity's therapist who works at the college. He is young and kind and gives Charity a journal for her to write down her thoughts because she has trouble talking about them out loud.

Mom - Charity's mother works at an insurance company. She never married Charity's father and probably never loved him. Mom loves her daughter but has trouble expressing her emotions. She is described as a practical woman.

Dad Charity's father. He moved from Nevada to California after his high school graduation and met Charity's mother. A moody photographer, It's strongly hinted that he suffered from depression before he disappeared from his daughter's life.

Aunt Ruth - Charity's aunt. She never married anyone. Aunt Ruth speaks her mind easily which makes Charity nervous.

Kaylee - Charity's childhood friend who moved away to Seattle years earlier. She appears in a flashback only.

Daniel - Charity's mom's ex-boyfriend. As a child, Charity wished he would marry her mother.

Brent - A classmate of Charity's. He "notices" her when other people don't.

Inspiration and origins
Christine Dzidrums revealed in 2011 that she is a reformed cutter. She wrote on her official website that the book is "the closest to any autobiographical novel" as she would ever write. Many years earlier, a friend discovered her cutting and convinced her to seek professional help.  Like Charity, Ms. Dzidrums was unable to find her voice during her therapy sessions so her therapist suggested she keep a journal. When she eventually showed her journal to her therapist after several months of logging entries, she was urged to try and publish it as it "offered valuable insight into a cutter’s mind." Only years later did she warm to the idea of transforming her journal into a fictional book for Young Adult readers.

Plot

Prologue
The novel begins with a brief introduction of Charity's life. For several years, she has been cruising through life on autopilot numb from any emotions. Although she goes to college, she has little enthusiasm for it and coasts through her classes with minimal effort. We learn on this particular day that her school-appointed therapist, Hunter, has given her a red journal so she can write down the thoughts she has trouble vocalizing throughout her sessions and day-to-day life. Used to feeling invisible her entire life, Charity is touched by Hunter's gesture and she experiences an onset of overwhelming emotions which frighten her. The scared teenager flees to a restroom, locks herself in a stall and cuts herself with a razor to numb the feelings that confuse her.

Main story
Encouraged by feeling genuine emotions for the first time in years, Charity vows to stop cutting and strive for a normal life. She uses the journal to reach out to her father, the man who left her when she was a baby. Although Charity doesn't know her father's whereabouts, she begins writing lengthy entries to him explaining what has happened to her in the years since he left.

Charity writes to her father that she knows very little about him. She knows he's from Henderson, Nevada and on the evening of his high school graduation, he drove to Long Beach, California to visit a friend. When he arrived his friend was out of town, but his female roommate (Charity's eventual mom) was home. The two embarked on a whirlwind romance and nine months later, their daughter, Charity, was born.

Plagued by depressive episodes, Charity's father is unable to keep a job so he becomes his child's primary caretaker. Charity's mom, however, is furious when he repeatedly disappears with their daughter for hours at a time. After a big blowup, Charity's dad storms out of their apartment and never returns.
 
Charity's journal descriptions reveal her strained, unfulfilled relationship with her mother. Like her child, Charity's mom has difficulty expressing her emotions and often shuns her daughter's attempts to discuss anything "messy." While Charity secretly yearns to talk about all emotions: the good, the bad, and ugly, her mother has little interest in sharing her intimate thoughts with anyone and is only a superficial presence in her child's life.

Feeling more lonely each day, Charity slips into an even deeper depression, stops seeing her therapist and returns to her familiar, comforting routine of cutting herself to distract herself from the emotional anguish she feels. She even steals her mother's prescription pain medication in a desperate attempt to self-medicate. Finally, she drops out of school but keeps it a secret from her mother.

In a later chapter Charity admits to her father that she discovered cutting six years earlier when she began struggling academically and socially at her middle school and "invented" a way to distract herself from the emotion pain she felt .  Despite the high frequency of her cutting, she always managed to keep it a secret from her everyone, including her mother.

It's not until college when Charity's secret is finally discovered, One of her teachers notices the scars on Charity's arms and sends her to the school therapist, Hunter. Feeling angry that she was coerced into therapy, a defiant Charity refuses to cooperate during therapy sessions.

As Charity's depression continues to worsen, her cutting increases to the point that she worries about her physical well-being. Finally. one day, the broken down cutter allows her mother to see her scars and the two seek professional help for her self-harming ways. The book ends with Charity writing a farewell entry to her father as she inches toward recovery. Although she still occasionally slips back into her cutting habit, the hopeful teenager now has her supportive mother by her side.

Reception
Cutters Don't Cry received a bronze medal in the 2010 Moonbeam Children's Book Awards under the mature issues category. Goodreads.com readers have also voted it their favorite book about cutting.

Follow-Up to Cutters Don't Cry
Christine Dzidrums' second novel, Kaylee: The "What If" Game has Charity's childhood friend Kaylee as its main character. Although Charity is not in the new book, she is discussed in a setting that takes place after Cutters Don't Cry.

Film version
Christine Dzidrums announced on the AWW Podcast that she is writing the screenplay for the film version of Cutters Don't Cry. She stated that she doesn't have a dream cast; She only wants it cast well.

References

External links 
About the Book at the author's website
Facebook Cutters Don't Cry Page
Creative Media Publishing

2010 American novels
American young adult novels